Nebularia peasei is a species of sea snail, a marine gastropod mollusk, in the family Mitridae, the miters or miter snails.

Distribution
This species occurs in Vietnamese part of the South China Sea. and occurs off Australia.

References

 Huang S.-I [Shih-I] & Chuo Q.-Y. [Qing-You]. (2019). Thirteen new species of Mitridae from Taiwan and the Indo-West Pacific Ocean (Mollusca: Gastropoda). Visaya. 5(3): 73-102.

External links
 H. (1860). Description of new species of Mitra from the collection of Hugh Cuming, Esq. Proceedings of the Zoological Society of London. 28: 366-368

peasei
Gastropods described in 1860